John Ben Andrew (15 May 1870 – 9 April 1911) was a South African international rugby union player who played as a forward.

He made 1 appearance for South Africa against the British Lions in 1896.

References

South African rugby union players
South Africa international rugby union players
1870 births
1911 deaths
Rugby union forwards
Rugby union players from Lancashire